I Am Anne Frank is a 1996 song cycle by Enid Futterman and Michael Cohen, adapted from their 1985 musical-theater piece Yours, Anne. A staged version  featured at the Ivey Awards under direction of Ben Krywoscz and musical direction of Mindy Eschedor of the Nautilus Music Theater. The New Jersey premiere took place at the Blairstown Theater Festival.

References

1996 musicals